Jolly LLB is a 2013 Indian Hindi-language black comedy film written and directed by Subhash Kapoor and produced by Fox Star Studios. The film stars Arshad Warsi, Boman Irani and Amrita Rao. The theatrical trailer was revealed on 8 January 2013. Released on 15 March 2013, the film revolves around the early life of Advocate Jagdish Tyagi a.k.a. Jolly and focuses on his attempt to earn six innocent wage earners their rights and his journey against the monopolistic behavior of the rich and judicial corruption. The storyline is inspired by the 1999 hit-and-run case of Sanjeev Nanda and a minor reference to Priyadarshini Mattoo case.

Plot
In 2009, Jagdish "Jolly" Tyagi is a Delhi-based lawyer staying with his brother-in-law Pratap and is in a relationship with Sandhya. He happens to see prominent criminal lawyer Tejinder Rajpal successfully defending Rahul Dewan, a boy from a high society family in a sessions court, who is accused of drunken driving in a Toyota Land Cruiser Prado causing death of six people sleeping on the footpath five months earlier.

Jolly, desperate to have some money and fame, decides to pursue the case and files a PIL in the court against Rahul Dewan. After initially reprimanding Jolly for his mistakes in filing the PIL and taking the press reports as evidence, Justice Sunderlal Tripathi warns Jolly to collect some evidence before the next hearing. Jolly then runs into Albert Pinto, who claims to have witnessed the accident but soon learns that he is a lackey of Rajpal and was a plan to extract more money from the Dewan family. As part of the deal, Pinto gives Jolly a share of the money and turns hostile in the court. Sandhya and Kaul Saab chide him for compromising on justice for his greed. He returns the money to Rajpal and challenges him to win the case.

With Pratap's help, Jolly collects the video footage of the car involved in the accident and presents it to the court. Rajpal counters that the car was driven by the driver of Dewan family and the footage was fake. Jolly refutes it by successfully cross examining the driver, who finally accepts that he has registered a false statement. The Judge orders the police to provide a bodyguard for Jolly after he is manhandled by Rajpal's assistants. Although Sub-Inspector Satbir Rathi, who is also on Rajpal's payroll, tries to sabotage him, Jolly, with the help of the bodyguard, leaves for Gorakhpur after he learns that Sadakant Mishra, a survivor of the accident stays there.

Jolly, after passing through many hurdles, successfully brings Mishra to the court. Rajpal tries to scuttle proceedings but the hesitant Tripathi overrules him. Mishra reveals the truth of the accident: that night, he and his relatives were sleeping on the footpath when Rahul Dewan drove his Land Cruiser over them, except Mishra. When he saw Mishra witnessing what he did, Rahul backed his car hoping to run over him, but instead ran over his leg, resulting in it being amputated. Mishra also states that Rathi had threatened him after the accident and fabricated the investigation. He was only allowed to go after he offered his hard-earned money and jewelry for his sister's wedding. Mishra also identifies Rahul Dewan as the one who drove the car. After the emotional closing arguments by Rajpal and Jolly, the judge directs the police department to suspend Rathi and initiate a criminal inquiry against him and also declares Rahul Dewan as guilty of the crime and sentences him to seven years in jail under Section 304 of the Indian Penal Code. As Jolly walks out receiving praises, Rajpal sits crestfallen over losing a case for the first time.

Cast

 Arshad Warsi as Advocate Jagdish Tyagi a.k.a. Jolly
 Boman Irani as Advocate Tejinder Rajpal
 Amrita Rao as Sandhya a.k.a. Sandhu
 Saurabh Shukla as Justice Sunderlal Tripathi
 Harsh Chhaya as Albert Pinto
 Manoj Pahwa as Pratap (Jolly's brother-in-law)
 Ramesh Deo as Kaul Saab
 Mohan Kapoor as Yograj Dewan (Rahul's father)
 Sanjay Mishra as Guruji
 Mohan Agashe as Senior Dewan (Rahul's grandfather)
 Vibha Chibber as Meerut Judge
 Sushil Pandey  as Sadakant Mishra
 Sandeep Bose as Sub-Inspector Satbir Rathi
 Rajeev Siddhartha as Rahul Dewan
 Brijendra Kala as Suresh Vashishth (in opening scene)
 Mukund Bhatt as Hawaldar Haldiram
 Vijay Gupta as Ramakant Shukla
 Vishal O Sharma as Lawyer
 Ishtiyak Khan as Vasu (Lawyer from Rohtak)

Production
The story is inspired by the events of the Sanjeev Nanda hit-and-run case of 1999.

Release

Critical reception
Taran Adarsh of Bollywood Hungama gave the film 3.5 stars and said "Jolly LLB is a power-packed courtroom drama. But, most importantly, it celebrates the spirit of the common man seeking justice and impartiality most effectively. Just don't miss this jolly good film!". Anupama Chopra of the Hindustan Times said parts of the film are "laugh-out-loud funny, but underneath the humour is an angry critique of the system, so easily manipulated by the rich and so difficult to penetrate for the poor."

Music

The music of Jolly LLB was composed by Krsna. Lyrics were penned by Subhash Kapoor and Vayu (for "Jhooth Boliya"). The first song promo, "Mere Toh L Lag Gaye" by Bappi Lahiri, was released on 13 February 2013. In the soundtrack, the song has been cut into two different songs, one titled "Law Lag Gaye" while the other "L Lag Gaye". The second song promo, "Jhooth Boliya" by Kamal Khan was released on 15 February 2013. The full soundtrack was released on 22 February 2013 under the label T-Series. It consists of eight songs.

Track listing

Awards
 61st National Film Awards
 National Film Award for Best Feature Film in Hindi
 National Film Award for Best Supporting Actor: Saurabh Shukla
 2014 Screen Awards
 Screen Award for Best Supporting Actor: Saurabh Shukla
 59th Filmfare Awards
 Filmfare Award for Best Story
 Filmfare Award for Best Dialogue
Kids Choice Awards 2014: Bindass!
 favourite song- mere Toh L Lag Gayi (won)
 favorite Geet Sensational - jhoot bolliya

Sequel

A sequel, Jolly LLB 2 was released in February 2017, with Shukla reprising his role.

Remake
The film has been remade in Tamil as Manithan (2016) and in Telugu as Sapthagiri LLB (2017). A sequel, Jolly LLB 2 was released in February 2017.

References

External links
 
 

2013 films
Indian legal films
2010s Hindi-language films
Films about corruption in India
Films scored by Krsna Solo
Films set in Delhi
Hindi films remade in other languages
Indian comedy-drama films
Indian black comedy films
Films featuring a Best Supporting Actor National Film Award-winning performance
Indian satirical films
Films about social issues in India
Best Hindi Feature Film National Film Award winners
Fox Star Studios films
Indian courtroom films
Fictional portrayals of the Delhi Police
Films directed by Subhash Kapoor